Rusty is the first and only full-length studio album by American math rock band Rodan. It was released in April 1994 on Quarterstick Records. The album takes its name from its engineer, Bob "Rusty" Weston.

Critical reception

Rusty received critical acclaim and has since been cited as an influential album, often compared favorably to Slint's 1991 album Spiderland. AllMusic writer Ned Raggett said, "this is an album to readily get lost in. The evident variety is another reason to listen, not least because everything is handled so aptly, parts of a greater overall whole."

Track listing

Personnel

Rodan
 Kevin Coultas – drums, vocals, guitar (1)
 Jeff Mueller – guitar, vocals
 Jason B. Noble – guitar, vocals, piano (1)
 Tara Jane O'Neil – bass guitar, vocals

Additional musicians
 Nat Barrett – cello (1)
 Eve Miller – cello (1)
 Christian Frederickson – viola (1)
 Michael Kurth – bass guitar (1)

Technical personnel
 Steve Good – engineering
 Jason Lowenstein – production
 Brian McMahan – engineering
 Bob Weston – engineering

References

External links
 

1994 debut albums
Quarterstick Records albums
Rodan (band) albums